USS Seven Seas (IX-68) was built by Bergsund M.V. Atkieb in Stockholm, Sweden, in 1912 and served the Swedish Navy as the training ship Abraham Rydberg. Acquired by the United States Navy from William S. Gubelmann of Marine Airways, Roslyn, New York, on 10 April 1942 and placed in service on 5 May 1942.

Service history
Seven Seas proceeded to the 7th Naval District on 8 May 1942, arriving at Key West, Florida, later that month. On 9 April, the auxiliary, full-rigged ship assumed duties as station ship at Key West.

Seven Seas remained at Key West until after the heyday of coastal U-boat strikes. As the dangers lessened, she was placed out of service and laid up at the Coast Guard Patrol Base, Port Everglades, Florida, on 22 May 1944. Seven Seas was struck from the Navy List on 29 July 1944.

References
 
 Navsource.org

Unclassified miscellaneous vessels of the United States Navy
Ships built in Stockholm
1912 ships